Gannett Company owns over 100 daily newspapers, and nearly 1,000 weekly newspapers. These operations are in 44 U.S. states, one U.S. territory, and six countries.

Newspapers

United States
USA Today (Tyson's Corner, Virginia)
USA Today Sports Weekly

Alabama
The Gadsden Times
The Montgomery Advertiser
The Tuscaloosa News

Arizona
The Arizona Republic (Phoenix)
Arizona Capital Times
Tucson Citizen

Arkansas
Alma Journal (Alma)
Booneville Democrat (Booneville)
Charleston Express (Charleston)
Southwest Times Record (Fort Smith)
The Hot Springs Village Voice (Hot Springs Village)
Paris Express (Paris)
Stuttgart Daily Leader
Press Argus Courier (Van Buren)
The Baxter Bulletin (Mountain Home)

California
Daily Press, Victorville
Redding Record Searchlight
The Desert Sun, Palm Springs
The Record, Stockton
The Salinas Californian
Tulare Advance-Register
Ventura County Star
Visalia Times-Delta
Siskiyou Daily News, Yreka

Colorado
Fort Collins Coloradoan
The Tribune-Democrat, La Junta
The Pueblo Chieftain

Connecticut
The Bulletin, Norwich

Delaware
The News Journal, Wilmington

Florida
Central Florida Future
Daily Commercial, Leesburg
Daytona Beach News-Journal, Volusia County
FSView & Florida Flambeau
Florida Today, Brevard County
Fort Myers News-Press
Naples Daily News
News Chief, Winter Haven
Northwest Florida Daily News, Fort Walton Beach
Ocala Star Banner
Palm Beach Daily News, West Palm Beach
Palm Beach Post West Palm Beach, Florida
Panama City News-Herald
Pensacola News Journal
Sarasota Herald-Tribune
Seminole Chronicle
Tallahassee Democrat
The Florida Times-Union, Jacksonville
The Gainesville Sun
Lakeland Ledger
The Palm Beach Post, West Palm Beach
The St. Augustine Record
Treasure Coast Newspapers
Indian River Press Journal, Vero Beach
The St. Lucie News-Tribune, Fort Pierce
The Stuart News, Stuart

Georgia
Athens Banner-Herald
The Augusta Chronicle, Augusta
Savannah Morning News

Guam
Pacific Daily News, Hagatna

Illinois
Canton Daily Ledger
The Journal Standard, Freeport
The Register-Mail, Galesburg
Star Courier, Kewanee
Lincoln Courier
The McDonough County Voice, Macomb
Pekin Daily Times
Peoria Journal Star
Pontiac Daily Leader
Rockford Register Star
The State Journal-Register, Springfield
Daily Review Atlas, Monmouth
Du Quoin Evening Call
Olney Daily Mail
The Carmi Times
The Daily Republican, Marion

Indiana
Clay City News
Ellettsville Journal
Evansville Courier & Press
The Herald-Times, Bloomington
The Indianapolis Star
Journal and Courier, Lafayette
Mooresville Decatur-Times
Paoli News-Republican
Palladium-Item, Richmond
Reporter-Times, Martinsville
South Bend Tribune
Spencer Evening World
Springs Valley Herald, French Lick
The Star Press, Muncie
Times-Mail, Bedford

Iowa
 Ames Tribune
Boone News-Republican
 Burlington Hawk Eye
The Des Moines Register
Iowa City Press-Citizen

Kansas
The Hutchinson News
Salina Journal
The Topeka Capital-Journal

Kentucky
The Courier-Journal, Louisville
The Gleaner, Henderson

Louisiana
The Town Talk, Alexandria
The Houma Courier
The Daily Advertiser, Lafayette
The News-Star, Monroe
Daily World, Opelousas
The Times, Shreveport
Thibodaux Daily Comet
Bastrop Daily Enterprise
Beauregard Daily News, DeRidder
New Orleans CityBusiness

Maryland
The Daily Times, Salisbury
The Herald-Mail, Hagerstown, Maryland.

Massachusetts
 Advocate, New Bedford
 Barnstable Patriot, Hyannis
 Bedford Minuteman, Bedford
 Belmont Citizen-Herald, Belmont
 Billerica Minuteman, Billerica
 Boston Homes, Boston
 Bourne Courier, Bourne
 Braintree Forum, Braintree
 Brookline Tab, Framingham
 Bulletin & Tab, Framingham
 Burlington Union, Burlington
 Cambridge Chronicle, Cambridge
 Cape Ann Beacon, Gloucester
 Cape Cod Times, Hyannis
 Carver Reporter, Carver
 Chronicle, New Bedford
 Chronicle & Transcript, Ipswich
 Cohasset Mariner, Cohasset
 Country Gazette, Framingham
 Courier & Sentinel, Wareham
 Eagle-Independent, Chelmsford
 Herald Citizen, Beverly
 Hudson Sun, Hudson
 Journal News Independent, Bridgewater
 Journal Sun, Canton
 Kingston Reporter, Kingston
 Leominster Champion, Leominster
 Lexington Minuteman, Lexington
 Marblehead Reporter, Marblehead
 Marlborough Enterprise, Marlborough
 Marshfield Mariner, Marshfield
 Marshfield News Herald, Marshfield
 Massachusetts Lawyers Weekly, Boston
 Medford Transcript, Medford
 Melrose Free Press, Melrose
 Middleboro Gazette, Middleboro
 Millbury Sutton Chronicle, Millbury
 The Inquirer and Mirror, Nantucket
 Needham Times, Needham
 Newton Tab, Newton
 North Shore Sunday, Danvers
 O Jornal, Fall River
 Observer-Advocate, Reading
 Old Colony Memorial, Plymouth
 Patriot Ledger, Quincy
 Pembroke Mariner & Reporter, Pembroke
 Record Citizen, Georgetown
 Rhode Island Lawyers Weekly, Boston
 Salem Gazette, Salem
 Sandwich Broadsider, Sandwich
 Saugus Advertiser, Saugus
 Scituate Mariner, Scituate
 Somerville Journal, Somerville
 Spectator, New Bedford
 Sun Advocate, Woburn
 Swampscott Reporter, Swampscott
 Taunton Daily Gazette, Taunton
 Tewksbury-Wilmington Advocate, Tewksbury
 The Arlington Advocate, Arlington
 The Beacon, Acton
 The Beacon-Villager, Maynard
 The Bulletin, Falmouth
 The Cape Codder, Brewster
 The Concord Journal, Concord
 The Enterprise, Brockton
 The Gardner News, Gardner
 The Grafton News, North Grafton
 The Herald News, Fall River
 The Hingham Journal, Hingham
 The Item, Clinton
 The Landmark, Holden
 The Mariner, Abington
 The MetroWest Daily News, Framingham
 The Milford Daily News, Milford
 The Newburyport Current, Newburyport
 The Press, Dover
 The Provincetown Banner, Provincetown
 The Register, Hyannis
 The Standard-Times, New Bedford
 The Sudbury Town Crier, Sudbury
 The Transcript TAB, Allston
 The Wayland Town Crier, Wayland
 The WellesleyTownsman, Wellesley
 The Weston Town Crier, Weston
 The Winchester Star, Winchester
 Times Advocate, Walpole
 Transcript & Bulletin, Dedham
 Village News, Hopkinton
 Waltham News Tribune, Waltham
 Watertown Tab & Press, Watertown
 Weymouth News, Weymouth
 Worcester Magazine, Worcester
 Worcester Telegram & Gazette, Worcester

Michigan
Battle Creek Enquirer
Bedford Now
Charlevoix Courier
Cheboygan Daily Tribune 
The Daily Reporter, Coldwater
The Daily Telegram, Adrian
Detroit Free Press
The Detroit News
Gaylord Herald Times
The Graphic, Petoskey
Hillsdale Daily News
The Holland Sentinel
Ionia Sentinel-Standard
Lansing State Journal
The Livingston County Daily Press & Argus
The Monroe News
Observer and Eccentric Newspapers
Petoskey News-Review
The Sault News 
Sturgis Journal
The Times Herald, Port Huron
Michigan Lawyers Weekly

Minnesota
St. Cloud Times
Finance & Commerce, Twin Cities and Rochester

Mississippi
Hattiesburg American
The Clarion-Ledger, Jackson

Missouri
Columbia Daily Tribune
Kirksville Daily Express
Moberly Monitor-Index
St. Louis Daily Record
The Rolla Daily News
Springfield News-Leader, Springfield

Montana
Great Falls Tribune

Nevada
Reno Gazette-Journal

New Hampshire
Foster's Daily Democrat
Portsmouth Herald

New Jersey
Asbury Park Press
Burlington County Times
Courier-News, Somerville
The Courier-Post, Cherry Hill
The Daily Journal, Vineland
Daily Record, Morristown
Herald News, Woodland Park
Home News Tribune, East Brunswick
New Jersey Herald, Newton
Ocean County Observer, Toms River
The Record, Hackensack
Suburban Trends, Butler

New Mexico
Alamogordo Daily News
Carlsbad Current-Argus
Deming Headlight
Farmington Daily Times
Las Cruces Sun-News
Ruidoso News
Silver City Sun-News

New York
Press & Sun-Bulletin, Binghamton
Daily Messenger, Canandaigua
The Corning Leader
Star-Gazette, Elmira
Herkimer Times Telegram
Hornell Spectator
The Ithaca Journal
Poughkeepsie Journal
Democrat and Chronicle, Rochester (original flagship newspaper)
The Journal News, Westchester County
Times Herald-Record, Middletown, NY (recordinline.com)
Utica Observer-Dispatch
Long Island Business News
Putnam Magazine
The Evening Tribune, Hornell
Wellsville Daily Reporter

North Carolina
Asheville Citizen-Times
The Courier-Tribune, Asheboro
Times-News, Burlington
Fayetteville Observer
Gaston Gazette
Times-News, Hendersonville
Jacksonville Daily News
Kinston Free Press
Lexington Dispatch
New Bern Sun Journal
Shelby Star
Wilmington Star News

Ohio
Akron Beacon Journal
The Alliance Review
Ashland Times-Gazette
Telegraph-Forum, Bucyrus
The Daily Jeffersonian, Cambridge
The Repository, Canton
Chillicothe Gazette
The Cincinnati Enquirer
The Columbus Dispatch
Coshocton Tribune
The Times-Reporter, Dover–New Philadelphia
The News-Messenger, Fremont
The Record-Courier, Kent
Lancaster Eagle-Gazette
Mansfield News Journal, Mansfield
The Marion Star
The Independent, Massillon
The Advocate (Newark), Newark
News Herald, Port Clinton
Times Recorder, Zanesville
The Daily Record, Wooster

Oklahoma
Bartlesville Examiner-Enterprise

The Journal Record, Oklahoma City
The Oklahoman, Oklahoma City

Oregon
Statesman Journal, Salem
The Register-Guard, Eugene
Daily Journal of Commerce, Portland

Pennsylvania
Erie Times-News
Lebanon Daily News
Public Opinion
York Daily Record
Beaver County Times
Hanover Evening Sun, Hanover
The Intelligencer, Doylestown
Ellwood City Ledger, Ellwood City
Tri-County Independent, Honesdale
Bucks County Courier Times
The Daily American, Somerset
Pocono Record, Stroudsburg
The Record Herald, Waynesboro

Rhode Island
The Newport Daily News
The Providence Journal

South Carolina
The Anderson Independent-Mail
The Greenville News
Spartanburg Herald-Journal
Link (magazine)

South Dakota
Argus Leader, Sioux Falls
Aberdeen American News
Watertown Public Opinion

Tennessee
Columbia Daily Herald
The Commercial Appeal, Memphis
The Daily News Journal, Murfreesboro
The Gallatin News Examiner
The Jackson Sun
The Knoxville News-Sentinel
The Leaf-Chronicle, Clarksville
The Oak Ridger
The Tennessean, Nashville

Texas
 Abilene Reporter-News
 Amarillo Globe News
 Austin American-Statesman
 Corpus Christi Caller-Times
 El Paso Times
 Lubbock Avalanche-Journal
 San Angelo Standard-Times
 Times Record News, Wichita Falls

Utah
The Spectrum, St. George

Vermont
The Burlington Free Press

Virginia
The Progress-Index, Petersburg
The News Leader, Staunton

Washington
 Kitsap Sun, Bremerton

West Virginia
Mineral Daily News-Tribune, Keyser

Wisconsin
The Post-Crescent, Appleton
Community Newspapers
Door County Advocate
Action Advertiser, Fond du Lac
The Reporter, Fond du Lac
Green Bay Press-Gazette
Herald Times Reporter, Manitowoc
Marshfield News-Herald
Milwaukee Journal Sentinel
Oshkosh Northwestern, Oshkosh
Stevens Point Journal
The Sheboygan Press
Wausau Daily Herald
Wisconsin Rapids Daily Tribune, Wisconsin Rapids

Others
Nursing Spectrum - mostly biweekly nursing employment magazines. Includes Nurseweek titles.

United Kingdom
Newsquest Media Group
 300 publications include the Glasgow Times and The Herald. (See the List of newspapers published by Newsquest.)

Other assets
 Clipper Magazine
 Gannett Directories
 Gannett News Service
 ReachLocal (Digital Marketing Company)
Reviewed (Product Reviews)
 WordStream (Digital Marketing Company)
 LocaliQ (Marketing Platform)

References

Gannett Company